Nanokogia is an extinct genus of pygmy sperm whale that lived off the coast of Panama during the Late Miocene.

Description
Nanokogia is distinguished from other kogiids in lacking functional teeth in the upper jaw, antorbital notches forming a narrow slit, antorbital notches within the supracranial basin, and the left premaxilla excluded from the sagittal facial crest. The absence of functional teeth is also seen in modern pygmy sperm whales and the extinct genus Scaphokogia.

Biology
Nanokogia relied on suction-feeding to capture squid and diel-migrating fishes, given the absence of functional teeth in the upper jaw.

References

Sperm whales
Miocene cetaceans
Miocene mammals of North America
Fossil taxa described in 2015